Highway 255 is a highway in the Canadian province of Saskatchewan. It runs from Highway 55 to Tobin Lake.

Highway 255 runs along Range Road 2133, Township Road 520, and Range Road 2130.

References

255